The Rackett Grange Hall No. 318, also known as Rackett Community Hall and denoted NeHBS No. GD04-002, is a building in rural Garden County, Nebraska, United States, that was built in 1926.  It was listed on the National Register of Historic Places in 2001.

It was located in the town of Rackett, which no longer exists;  it is now located in a remote area within what is now Crescent Lake National Wildlife Refuge.

It is a false-front commercial building;  other historic resources of the property are a shed, an outhouse, and a well with a hand pump.  The property is significant for its association with the Grange, the Patrons of Husbandry movement.  And the building also is significant as a now-rare example of the once-common false-front architecture.

References

Buildings and structures completed in 1926
Buildings and structures in Garden County, Nebraska
Clubhouses on the National Register of Historic Places in Nebraska
Grange organizations and buildings
National Register of Historic Places in Garden County, Nebraska
Grange buildings on the National Register of Historic Places